In mathematics, a Petersson algebra is a composition algebra over a field constructed from an order-3 automorphism of a Hurwitz algebra.

Construction

Suppose that C is a Hurwitz algebra and φ is an order 3 automorphism. Define the new product of x and y to be φ()φ2(). With this new product the algebra is called a Petersson algebra.

References

 
 

Composition algebras
Non-associative algebras